David Vicente Robles (born 23 April 1999) is a Spanish footballer who plays for CD Mirandés. Mainly a right back, he can also play as a winger.

Club career
Born in Zaragoza, Vicente joined Real Zaragoza's youth setup in 2017, from Stadium Casablanca. On 4 October of that year, he extended his contract with the club.

On 30 November 2017, before even appearing for the reserves, Vicente made his first team debut by starting in a 4-1 away loss against Valencia CF, for the season's Copa del Rey. He would resume his spell at the club with the B's mainly in Tercera División, however.

On 5 October 2020, Vicente signed for another reserve team, UD Las Palmas Atlético in Segunda División B. In June 2022, he was definitely promoted to the main squad in Segunda División, but terminated his contract on 11 August, and moved to Primera División RFEF side Unionistas de Salamanca CF just hours later.

An undisputed starter for Unionistas, Vicente returned to the second level on 23 January 2023, after agreeing to an 18-month deal with CD Mirandés.

Personal life
Vicente's twin brother Carlos is also a footballer. A forward, he also represented Zaragoza.

References

External links
Aúpa Deportivo Aragón profile 

1999 births
Living people
Spanish twins
Footballers from Zaragoza
Twin sportspeople
Spanish footballers
Association football defenders
Association football wingers
Primera Federación players
Segunda División B players
Segunda Federación players
Tercera División players
Real Zaragoza B players
Real Zaragoza players
UD Las Palmas Atlético players
Unionistas de Salamanca CF players
CD Mirandés footballers